Deputy First Minister can refer to:

 Deputy First Minister of Northern Ireland
 Deputy First Minister of Scotland
 Deputy First Minister for Wales

See also
 Deputy Prime Minister